The 2011 women's road cycling season was the seventh year for AA Drink–leontien.nl (UCI code: LNL), which began as Van Bemmelen–AA Drink in 2005.

Roster

Season victories

Road cycling

Track cycling

Other achievements

Dutch national record, team pursuit

Kirsten Wild, as part of the national team, broke twice together with Ellen van Dijk and Vera Koedooder or Amy Pieters the Dutch team pursuit record.

Results in major races

Single day races

Grand Tours

UCI World Ranking

The team finished fifth in the UCI ranking for teams.

References

2011 UCI Women's Teams seasons
2011 in Dutch sport
AA Drink–leontien.nl